The Alexander City Micropolitan Statistical Area is a former micropolitan statistical area that consisted of two counties in Alabama, anchored by the city of Alexander City, as defined by the United States Census Bureau. As of the 2010 census, the μSA had a population of 53,155.

In 2013, the United States Office of Management and Budget removed the Alexander City micropolitan statistical area from its list of metropolitan and micropolitan areas. Coosa County was added to the Talladega-Sylacauga, AL micropolitan statistical area.

The Alexander City Micropolitan Statistical Area was part of the Montgomery–Alexander City Combined Statistical Area.

Counties
Coosa
Tallapoosa

Communities
Places with more than 10,000 inhabitants
Alexander City (Principal city)
Places with 1,000 to 5,000 inhabitants
Camp Hill
Dadeville
Goodwater
Tallassee (partial)
Places with less than 1,000 inhabitants
Daviston
Goldville
Jackson's Gap
Kellyton
New Site
Rockford

Demographics
As of the census of 2000, there were 53,677 people, 21,338 households, and 15,217 families residing within the μSA. The racial makeup of the μSA was 71.31% White, 27.37% African American, 0.28% Native American, 0.15% Asian, 0.01% Pacific Islander, 0.27% from other races, and 0.62% from two or more races. Hispanic or Latino of any race were 0.75% of the population.

The median income for a household in the μSA was $30,309, and the median income for a family was $37,115. Males had a median income of $26,974 versus $19,088 for females. The per capita income for the μSA was $15,892.

See also
Alabama census statistical areas

References

 
Geography of Tallapoosa County, Alabama
Geography of Coosa County, Alabama
Micropolitan areas of Alabama